Saint-Anaclet-de-Lessard is a parish municipality in the Canadian province of Quebec, located in the Rimouski-Neigette Regional County Municipality.

Demographics 

See also
 List of parish municipalities in Quebec

References

External links
 

Parish municipalities in Quebec
Incorporated places in Bas-Saint-Laurent